Santa Lucía is the sixth station on line B of the Medellín Metro from the center going west. It is named after the Santa Lucía neighbourhood where it is located. The station was opened on 28 February 1996 as part of the inaugural section of line B, from San Javier to San Antonio.

References

External links
 Official site of Medellín Metro 

Medellín Metro stations
Railway stations opened in 1996
1996 establishments in Colombia